Eric Lance White (born December 30, 1965) is an American former professional basketball player. Born in San Francisco, he played collegiately at Pepperdine University from 1983 to 1987. He was listed as a 6'8" (2.03 m) and 200 lb (91 kg) forward.

White was selected in the 3rd round with the 19th pick of the 1987 NBA draft by the Detroit Pistons. From 1987 to 1989 he played in just two NBA seasons, with the L.A. Clippers and the Utah Jazz, averaging 6.1 points and 2.4 rebounds per game. He was selected as an expansion draft pick by the Minnesota Timberwolves in 1989.

Notes

External links
College & NBA stats @ basketballreference.com

1965 births
Living people
American expatriate basketball people in France
American expatriate basketball people in Spain
Basketball players from San Francisco
CB Estudiantes players
Detroit Pistons draft picks
Liga ACB players
Los Angeles Clippers players
Minnesota Timberwolves expansion draft picks
Mississippi Jets players
Pepperdine Waves men's basketball players
Sioux Falls Skyforce (CBA) players
Small forwards
Utah Jazz players
Wichita Falls Texans players
American men's basketball players
Champagne Châlons-Reims Basket players